Hungary competed at the 1968 Winter Olympics in Grenoble, France.

Cross-country skiing

Men

Women

Figure skating

Men

Women

Ski jumping

Speed skating

Men

References
Official Olympic Reports
International Olympic Committee results database
 Olympic Winter Games 1968, full results by sports-reference.com

Nations at the 1968 Winter Olympics
1968
1968 in Hungarian sport